The Prost AP02 was the car with which the Prost Formula One team competed in the 1999 Formula One season.  It was driven by Olivier Panis, in his sixth season with the team (including Ligier), and Jarno Trulli, in his second full season with the team.

After the team's dramatic slump in 1998, the 1999 season marked a small improvement in form. John Barnard, who had designed Prost's championship winning McLarens of the mid 1980s was brought in to help develop the car. The car showed flashes of promise, especially when Trulli scored his first podium finish at the wet 1999 European Grand Prix.  The Italian moved to Jordan to replace the retiring Damon Hill for 2000, whilst Panis endured another frustrating year, often let down by reliability and left the team at the end of the season to join McLaren as a test driver.

The team finished 7th in the Constructors' Championship, with nine points.

The AP02 later became notable for being the first F1 car driven by future World Champion Jenson Button in an official test session, in December 1999.

Prost used 'Gauloises' logos, except at the French, British and Belgian Grands Prix.

Complete Formula One results
(key) (results in bold indicate pole position)

References

AUTOCOURSE 1999-2000, Henry, Alan (ed.), Hazleton Publishing Ltd. (1999)

External links

Prost Formula One cars
1999 Formula One season cars